"Sinister War" is a 2021 comic book storyline published by Marvel Comics, starring the character Spider-Man and written by Nick Spencer. The story deals with Spider-Man being in the middle of a conflict between multiple teams of villains, including the Sinister Six and Savage Six, orchestrated by Kindred. The storyline received mixed reviews from critics with many deeming it as an underwhelming conclusion to Nick Spencer's Spider-Man run due to inconsistent art, sluggish pacing, and Kindred.

Plot

Prelude
Following Kraven the Hunter kidnapping animal styled supervillains and superheroes, Vulture forms the new Savage Six using King Cobra, Rhino, Scorpion, Stegron and Tarantula, while the Last Son of Kraven becomes the new Kraven the Hunter after the original one's death.

While Doctor Octopus is discovering clues to some of his missing memories, he exhumes an unexpectedly empty casket in a cemetery. The demon Kindred sends one of his centipedes to enter Doctor Octopus' ear, rendering him unconscious.

Kindred tells Doctor Octopus that he can help him with his memories, but he will need to gather five more people. At an unknown beach, Doctor Octopus helps Sandman with his loss of direction and promises to solve Sandman's immortality problem. Upon building a special machine, Doctor Octopus resurrects Electro with his powers intact as Kindred comments on Electro's abilities while stating that Doctor Octopus is getting closer to his true self. Doctor Octopus and Electro find Kraven the Hunter in the Savage Land hunting a dinosaur. Electro shocks the dinosaur, and Doctor Octopus recruits Kraven the Hunter into the Sinister Six by promising him to hunt down the Lizard. Doctor Octopus coerces Curt Connors into using the Isotope Genome Accelerator on himself which separates him from his Lizard side. Kindred then completes the Sinister Six by having Mysterio join him as Kindred notes that his endgame with Spider-Man is approaching.

Part 1
In Las Vegas, Doctor Strange talks with the demon Mephisto at Hotel Inferno over his part in corrupting Peter Parker's soul. Mephisto tells Strange he can only make deals with those willing to offer something in return. Meanwhile, Peter and Mary Jane Watson are attending the premiere of MJ's new movie which she worked on with Mysterio under the alias of Cage McKnight. Peter is planning to propose to Mary Jane when the movie is over in front of the press and public, but the Savage Six take the opportunity to attack. With Carlie Cooper and Harry Lyman as his prisoners, Kindred prepares for his final meeting with Spider-Man. Peter switches to Spider-Man to try and protect Mary Jane, who stands her ground against the Tarantula and Spider-Man notes that he barely fought King Cobra. Mysterio comes to Mary Jane's rescue, exposing his identity to Peter and the Savage Six. Doctor Octopus then attacks the theater with Electro, Kraven the Hunter, Lizard, and Sandman as Doctor Octopus states to Vulture that they need Mysterio. Mary Jane confesses to a concerned Peter that she knew who Mysterio was all along and vouches for him. Mysterio tries to tell Peter that he and Mary Jane's deal with Mephisto is to blame for everything that is presently happening, but Peter is far too distracted by the warring factions. Doctor Octopus offers Mysterio the opportunity to join the Sinister Six as long as he helps them capture Mary Jane. Mysterio complies and teleports away taking Mary Jane with him while promising her that the "devil will get his due". Peter is knocked out by Octavius and awakens in Kindred's lair, where the demon again tortures and taunts him using mirrors containing Mary Jane, Mysterio, and a brutalized Norman Osborn in them. As Kindred states that this is now a party, Spider-Man sees villains like Black Ant, Boomerang, Chance, Foreigner, Hydro-Man, Jack O'Lantern, Overdrive, Shocker, the Sinister Syndicate (Beetle, Electro II, Lady Octopus, Scorpia, Trapster, and White Rabbit), Slyde, Speed Demon, and Taskmaster racing towards him through the shattered mirrors. Back at Hotel Inferno, Strange demands Mephisto undo his deal with Spider-Man, but the demon claims his hands are tied. He then offers Strange a chance to "claim" more information as a prize in a game of chance.

Amazing Spider-Man #71
Prisoners of Kindred, Carlie Cooper tries to give Harry Lyman a motivational speech, reminding him of his family. Harry tells her this is not the first time he's failed them and that no matter how happy he is, how hard he tries to put things right, something is always there to remind him that none of it is real and that none of it will ever last. After more coaxing from Carlie, Harry suddenly notices that the door to their cell is open and suggests there is a way to escape. Norman awakens and arranges a meeting with a lawyer who shows him Mendel Stromm's video will. Stromm has left Norman a deposit box containing a key and instructs him to travel to Europe to face his "legacy" (or rather his "sin" according to Kindred). As Peter takes a beating from the Sinister Six, Mary Jane is transported to Mysterio's old studios where Beck reveals what happened to him after his suicide, transported to hell, and tortured there until Harry Osborn made him a deal. Taking it, Beck was revived around the time Peter's identity was public knowledge, his adventures in the Spider-Men crossover are referenced, and over time Harry stopped communicating with him until recently. Mysterio also reveals to Mary Jane that he was the therapist who helped her come to terms with Harry's death, but Mary Jane barely remembers this. Mary Jane pleas with Beck, reminding him he's changed, but Mysterio remains loyal to the deal he struck and tells Mary Jane that he knows what fate awaits him. Mysterio rejoins the teams of villains while leaving Mary Jane to the mercy of Kindred.

Part 2
As Doctor Octopus gets frustrated that Kindred has not given him the answers he needed yet while leading the Sinister Six which Kindred comments about, Spider-Man is struggling in the graveyard avoiding the attacks of Foreigner, Taskmaster, Black Ant, Chance, Jack O'Lantern, and Slyde who are out to make sure that Spider-Man doesn't leave the graveyard alive. Earlier, Foreigner's group was robbing an armored truck when they get attacked by Kindred's giant centipedes. Back in the present, Overdrive grabs Spider-Man who plans to get some distance as Boomerang, Hydro-Man, Shocker, and Speed Demon buy Overdrive some time. Shocker advises Overdrive not to kill Spider-Man without him as he and Hydro-Man attack Foreigner's group together. Earlier, Hydro-Man was with Shocker and Speed Demon where it was mentioned that Hydro-Man wasn't part of their Superior Foes. Overdrive started a driving service while planning to find Carlie Cooper. They are then snatched up by Kindred's giant centipedes. Back in the present, Overdrive is intercepted by the Syndicate as Spider-Man avoids their attacks. However, he is mortally wounded by Ana Kravinoff, the Syndicate's latest member. Earlier, Scorpia and Beetle argue about Ana joining their group with Beetle stating that they are the Sinister Syndicate and not the Sinister Six. Their dispute is interrupted by Kindred's giant centipedes. Foreigner's group, the Superior Foes, and the Syndicate find themselves before Kindred. When Taskmaster tries to attack, Kindred causes Taskmaster pain and reveals that he placed centipedes in all their heads while they were sleeping. Kindred states that he will consider killing the centipedes before they finish eating their brains, but they will be condemned to Hell either way. He challenges them to kill Spider-Man in order to punish him for his sins as if their "afterlife" depends on it. Stating that whoever pulls off the job will become his right hand, he advises them to get it done or else he will find someone who will do the job as both the Sinister Six and the Savage Six are shown.

Part 3
Badly wounded, Peter is relieved to find the Black Cat, Wolverine, and Human Torch have arrived to help, unaware they are Mysterio, Lizard, and Electro in illusion disguises created by the former. Lizard springs their trap too early by attacking Peter, much to Mysterio's annoyance. Peter fends off the Sinister Six until Doctor Octopus snares him with his tentacles. Peter attempts to appeal to Doctor Octopus' better nature, telling him he is not like this anymore. Doctor Octopus briefly hesitates, but mounting pressure from the rest of the Sinister Six compels him to act though this buys Peter enough time to break free. The Savage Six then attack the Sinister Six, giving Peter time to escape. Boomerang also has a change of heart and helps Peter escape as all of the assembled six-member teams brawl for the right to claim Spider-Man's life. Kindred revives the Sin-Eater, who is still angered at Kindred for forsaking him, once more. From Sin-Eater's reanimated corpse springs forth demonic centipedes that seek out and take possession of Grey Gargoyle, Living Laser, Whirlwind, Juggernaut, and Morlun. Led by Sin-Eater, the "Sinful Six" corner Peter in an alleyway and are ready to finish him off. As the various Sinister factions compete with each other to target Spider-Man, Kindred states that they are the players as he plans to invite Spider-Man to witness the end.

Amazing Spider-Man #72
Earlier in the day while Peter fends off the attack from the Sinister Six, Kindred continues to taunt Mary Jane in his lair. Through a series of flashbacks dating back to his childhood, it is revealed that Harry Osborn's entire life of misery, addiction, despair, and even death were defined by a deal his father struck with Mephisto to make his life much more prosperous at the cost of his own son's soul, inevitably also tying Norman's descent into insanity and criminal career to the demonic overlord. Over in Europe, Norman discovers a hidden lab housing two cloning pods and an A.I. taking the form of his son. The A.I. explains that being a survivor, he uploaded his brain waves into this machine just so he could taunt his father from the grave. Meanwhile, Harry Lyman and Carlie discover that Carlie's morgue is housed within Kindred's lair and Harry discovers his own body. Kindred admits to Mary Jane he has not been entirely honest with her and is not "exactly" who she believes him to be. It is time she learned the truth, no matter the cost, and unmasks to reveal a face that shocks Mary Jane.

Part 4
Spider-Man manages to jam Sin Eater's gun with the resulting implosion cripples him. Doctor Octopus picks one of the centipedes from Sin-Eater's brain and scrambles to piece together a sonic transducer. Spider-Man is cornered by Morlun, who prepares to feast on him before Boomerang saves Spider-Man in the nick of time. Morlun turns on Boomerang and drains him of his life essence. Doctor Octopus activates his transducer that he slipped in Black Ant's helmet and successfully disables the centipedes, knocking out everyone except himself and Spider-Man. He then urges Peter to make himself scarce before the factions can recover as many would still want to kill him, or before he changes his mind to not kill Spider-Man. Meanwhile in Las Vegas, Mephisto's game of chance ends in a loss for the devil. Doctor Strange asks what will become of Spider-Man and Mephisto answers that while Peter has walked away from a war where the odds were stacked against him, he should enjoy the small victories as a much bigger loss is imminent.

Amazing Spider-Man #73
Peter is transported to Paris where he is beaten soundly by Kindred. Elsewhere at Mysterio's studio, another Kindred is revealed to have the face of a woman to Mary Jane. Mary Jane believes it at first to be Gwen Stacy but is in actuality Sarah Stacy, who for many years was believed to be one of Gwen and Norman's children. It is revealed to Norman by the A.I. unit of Harry Osborn that Sarah and her brother Gabriel were clones of Gwen and Harry himself created in a lab as part of a conspiracy he orchestrated with the help of Mendell Stromm, Mysterio, and Chameleon to psychologically toy with Peter and Norman. Many clones of Sarah and Gabriel were created, each succumbing to cellular degeneration. Eventually, durable models were sent out into the world to carry out Harry's deception with Mysterio rewiring MJ and Norman's memories so both would have the false knowledge of the Stacy/Osborn relationship as well as the belief that Harry Osborn had truly returned from the dead. Harry Lyman confesses to Carlie, upon seeing his own corpse in the morgue, that he knew of this all along and journeys deep into the catacombs by himself. Now Gabriel and Sarah's usefulness is to serve only as husks to Kindred, who tells Mary Jane the time has come to face her own sins. Elsewhere in Las Vegas, Doctor Strange asks Mephisto to stop playing games, with Mephisto offering him one final wager... the virtue of a hero against the corruption of a soul.

Amazing Spider-Man #74
The wager is for the soul of the original Harry Osborn, who is influencing the Kindred Twins, with Sarah being the Kindred confronting Mary Jane and Gabriel being the Kindred tormenting Peter. Their souls were tortured by Mephisto each time they died, corrupted, and twisted into his demonic lackeys alongside the Harry Osborn A.I. that Mephisto had controlled from the beginning. Harry Lyman reveals to Carlie that he is also a clone of Harry Osborn. Equipping himself with a goblin glider and pumpkin bombs, Harry helps Peter, Norman, and Mary Jane battle the Kindred Twins, but is eventually killed. After Mary Jane saves Peter's life, their show of love defeats the Kindred Twins, who are released from Mephisto's control by Doctor Strange before they permanently degenerate as they are told that Gwen would have loved them. With Kindred vanquished and the "Sinister War" over, Peter and Mary Jane return home to heal and face the dawn of a new day together as a loving and unbreakable couple. When Doctor Strange questions why he attempted to claim Peter in the first place, Mephisto reveals he foresaw a future where Peter will defeat him and end his reign over the Earth with the fallen bodies of Hulk, Human Torch, Storm, and Wolverine scattered across the battlefield. As Doctor Strange departs, he reminds Mephisto that the love that Peter shares with those closest to him will always enhance his life and make every one of them better. The vision of Mephisto's future changes to show it is Peter and Mary Jane's daughter who ultimately thwarts his reign.

Critical reception
On Comic Book Roundup, the series so far has received an average score of 7.2 out of 10 based on 37 reviews.

Notes

References

Fictional wars